Roru or Roroo is an ancient village in Laxmangarh tehsil in Sikar district in Rajasthan, India

References

External links
 Villages in the Lachhmangarh tehsil, Sikar district, Rajasthan

Villages in Sikar district